Hrotovice is a town in Třebíč District in the Vysočina Region of the Czech Republic. It has about 1,800 inhabitants.

History
The first written mention of Hrotovice is from 1228.

Notable people
František Bohumír Zvěřina (1835–1908), painter

References

External links

Cities and towns in the Czech Republic
Populated places in Třebíč District